Gracilinitocris is a genus of longhorn beetles of the subfamily Lamiinae, containing the following species:

 Gracilinitocris gracilenta (Kolbe, 1893)
 Gracilinitocris nigrifrons Breuning, 1950

References

Saperdini